Dorycera subasiatica is a species of ulidiid or picture-winged fly in the genus Dorycera of the family Tephritidae.

References

subasiatica